The Promissory Oaths Act 1871 (34 & 35 Vict. c. 48) is an Act of the Parliament of the United Kingdom.

It was passed with a view to the revision of the statute law, and particularly to the preparation of the revised edition of the statutes then in progress.

See also
Oaths Act
Statute Law Revision Act

References
Halsbury's Statutes,

External links
The Promissory Oaths Act 1871, as amended from the National Archives.
The Promissory Oaths Act 1871, as originally enacted from the National Archives.
List of amendments and repeals in the Republic of Ireland from the Irish Statute Book

United Kingdom Acts of Parliament 1871
Oaths